Forest Creatures is a 2010 Croatian black comedy film directed by Ivan-Goran Vitez.

Cast 
 Vili Matula as Branko Dvornik
 Hana Hegedušić as Vesna
 Željko Konigsknecht as Sanjin
 Nataša Dangubić as Maja
 Jakša Borić as Rinus
 Marko Makovičić as Edi
 Vinko Kraljević as Siniša

The cast also includes Luka Peroš.

References

External links 
 Šuma summarum at hrfilm.hr 

Croatian comedy films
2010 black comedy films
2010 films